Guizhou Airlines was an airline based in Guiyang, Guizhou, China. It was a small provincial subsidiary of China Southern Airlines  operated scheduled domestic passenger and cargo services in southern China. Its main base was Guiyang Longdongbao Airport, Guizhou. In 1998, it merged into China Southern Airlines.

History 
The airline was established in 1991. It was owned by China Southern Airlines (60%) and Guizhou Xianfei Industrial (40%).

Fleet 
The Guizhou Airlines fleet consists of the following aircraft (as of August 2019):

Guizhou Airlines previously operated the following aircraft:
 1 Boeing 737-300 from July 1998 to March 2004, when it was returned to China Southern Airlines.
 1 further Boeing 737-700
 2 Xian Y-7-100
 5 further Boeing 737-800

References

External links

China Southern Airlines 

Defunct airlines of China
Airlines established in 1991
Chinese companies established in 1991
Transport in Guizhou
Companies based in Guizhou
China Southern Airlines